Peter Anton von Verschaffelt (8 May 1710 – 5 July 1793) was a Flemish sculptor and architect.

Verschaffelt designed, among other things in Mannheim, the high altar of the Jesuit church (Jesuitenkirche), the arsenal and the Bretzenheim Palace, as well as the church Wallfahrtskirche Mariä Himmelfahrt in Oggersheim (now part of Ludwigshafen).

Life and work
Verschaffelt was born in Ghent, Flanders in the Spanish Netherlands, as Pieter Antoon Verschaffelt. After his apprentice years in Ghent in the workshop of his grandfather, Verschaffelt worked in Brussels, Paris and, from 1737 to 1751, in Rome. In 1748, he received the commission to replace the damaged statue of the archangel Michael on the Castel Sant'Angelo in Rome, although it was not installed until 1753.

In 1752 Verschaffelt moved to London. From there, he was appointed as a successor to the sculptor Paul Egell as court sculptor to Charles Theodore, Elector of the Palatinate, in Mannheim, Germany. Among his first tasks was the landscaping and statuary in the palace garden of Schwetzingen, for which he created the deer and the group of rivers, which are the key features of the park.

He died in Mannheim, Electoral Palatinate, Holy Roman Empire, aged 83.

Gallery

References

Sources
This article is based in part on material from the German Wikipedia.
 Beisel, Edmund (1920)  Ritter Peter Anton von Verschaffelt als Architekt Berlin
 Beringer, Joseph August (1902) Peter Anton von Verschaffelt. Sein Leben und Werk Strasbourg

External links

Peter Anton von Verschaffelt Art net in English

Peter Anton von Verschaffelt University of Heidelberg in German

Flemish Baroque architects
Architects of the Austrian Netherlands
Flemish Baroque sculptors
Court sculptors
1710 births
1793 deaths